Mercyhurst University, formerly Mercyhurst College, is a private Roman Catholic university in Erie, Pennsylvania.

History 
On September 20, 1926, Mercyhurst College opened its doors just a few blocks away from the city's southern boundary. It was founded by the Sisters of Mercy of the Diocese of Erie, who were led by Mother M. Borgia Egan, who became the first president of Mercyhurst College. The college received its charter on October 5, 1928.

In 1963, the college prep department separated to form Mercyhurst Preparatory School, which is located behind the university. On February 3, 1969, the board of trustees voted to make Mercyhurst a coed college. From its foundation in 1926 until 1972, members of the Sisters of Mercy had been presidents of the college. After 1972, lay presidents led the college. On March 27, 1991, Mercyhurst purchased the 100-year-old Redemptorist Seminary in North East and turned it into a branch campus, offering associate degrees and one-year certificates.

Among its five campuses, enrollment has grown to over 4,000 students instructed by 168 faculty. The endowment has increased to more than $20 million and its budget is more than $85 million.

The Mary D'Angelo Performing Arts Center opened in February 1996. Then, in fall 2002, the $7.5 million Audrey Hirt Academic Center opened on the southeast edge of campus, a building funded largely through the college's $22.8 million capital campaign.

In August 2005, the $5 million Michele and Tom Ridge Health and Safety Building was dedicated at Mercyhurst North East. A $1.3 million residential apartment complex also opened in time for the North East campus' academic year.

The board of trustees elected Dr. Thomas J. Gamble as the 11th president of Mercyhurst College. Dr. Gamble, who previously served as vice president of academic affairs at the college, assumed the presidency March 1, 2006.

The construction of a $14 million freshman residence hall began in fall 2008, and the hall opened in the fall of 2009.

Opened in September 2012 is the Center for Academic Engagement, a four-story,  building that will be set into the rolling hill north of Hammermill Library and feature a skywalk over East Main Drive to connect the two facilities. The building, which boasts many green technologies, houses classrooms and lab space for two of Mercyhurst's signature programs—Intelligence Studies and Hospitality Management—as well as the Evelyn Lincoln Institute for Ethics and Society and the Mercyhurst Center for Applied Politics (MCAP). On January 25, 2012, Mercyhurst College officially became Mercyhurst University.

The Board of Trustees of Mercyhurst University appointed Michael T. Victor, J.D., LL.D., as the 12th president of Mercyhurst University on May 19, 2015. Victor had served as president of Lake Erie College in Painesville, Ohio, since 2006. Victor served as dean of the Walker School of Business at Mercyhurst  from 2002 to 2006. He took office on Aug. 3, 2015.

On August 16, 2018, Mercyhurst University opened a $25 million residence hall. Ryan Hall houses more than 350 student suites. It also includes a dining hall, lounge area, convenience store, and a 150-seat banquet hall.

Sexual assault allegations
On October 10, 2004, the Erie Times-News published a story stating that former president Dr. William Garvey molested grade school boys while serving as a basketball coach at St. John the Baptist Catholic Church in Erie. The article further stated that "two current Erie residents told the Erie Times-News that Garvey paid them to have sex with him in the early to mid-1980s, when both men were minors." On December 17 the paper reported that Garvey "abruptly announced his retirement Thursday, months before the completion of a college-ordered investigation Garvey had predicted would exonerate him."  

Several months after Garvey retired, an investigation conducted by retired Erie County Judge Michael Palmisano, at the instruction of the board of trustees, determined that the allegations against Garvey "appear[ed] to have merit". The campus' central  park was once named "Garvey Park" in honor of Garvey, but following the allegations was renamed to "Trinity Green".

Wheelchair incident
On March 14, 2023, a video was posted to the social media website Twitter that depicted Mercyhurst student Carson Briere pushing an unoccupied wheelchair down the stairway of a bar. The author of the tweet claimed that the owner of the wheelchair had left it at the top of the steps as she needed to be carried downstairs in order to use the bar's restroom. The video received strong backlash on social media and from citizens in the community. On March 15, 2023, Briere issued an apology over the incident. Mercyhurst also released a statement, in which they claimed that Briere was placed on interim suspension from the hockey team and that they "pray for and are in solidarity with the victim and all persons with disabilities".

Campus
The university still maintains its campus  in North East, Pennsylvania at the site of the former St. Mary's Seminary. The university has also operated Mercyhurst Corry, a school offering an associate degree in business administration, for over 25 years.

The university's fifth campus, Mercyhurst West, was located in Girard, Pennsylvania, at the site of the former Faith Lutheran Church. Classes began at this location in fall 2006. Due to low enrollment, the campus closed at the end of the 2013–2014 school year.

Academics
Enrollment at Mercyhurst University's Erie campus is nearly 4,500 students. The university formerly was on a trimester calendar and moved to a 4–1–4 calendar for the 2013–2014 school year. Currently, the university is on a traditional semester calendar. It has more than 57 undergraduate degrees and almost 25 percent of the student body chooses to study abroad. Undergraduate students at Mercyhurst all complete the REACH curriculum, which stands for Reason and Faith, Expression and Creativity, Analytical Thought, Contexts and Systems, and Humans in Connection.

The university is organized into four colleges:
 The Hafenmaier College of Humanities, Arts, and Social Sciences
 The Walker College of Business
 The Zurn College of Natural and Health Sciences
 The Ridge College of Intelligence Studies & Applied Sciences

Athletics 

Mercyhurst University competes in two NCAA Division I and 23 NCAA Division II sports as the Lakers, one of the newest members of the Pennsylvania State Athletic Conference (PSAC).  Around 15 percent of the student body consists of student-athletes.

NCAA Division I sports
 Men's ice hockey (Atlantic Hockey)
 Women's ice hockey (College Hockey America)

NCAA Division II sports

 Baseball
 Men's & women's basketball
 Men's & women's cross country
 Field hockey
 American football
 Men's & women's golf
 Men's lacrosse (ECAC)
 Women's lacrosse
 Women's rowing (ECAC)
 Men's & Women's Soccer
 Softball
 Men's & women's tennis
 Women's volleyball
 Men's & women's water polo (Collegiate Water Polo Association on the men's side and Western Water Polo Association on the women's side)
 Wrestling
Women's bowling 

National championships
 1976: Men's tennis – NAIA
 2004: Women's rowing (team champion) – NCAA Division II
 2005: Men's rowing (4+ open) – ECAC National Champion
 2009: Josh Shields (165 lbs), wrestling – NCAA Division II
 2010: Women's rowing (8+ champion) – NCAA Division II
 2011: Men's lacrosse – NCAA Division II

National finalist
 2005: Ben McAvinew (184 lbs), wrestling – NCAA Division II
 2006: Zach Schafer (165 lbs), wrestling – NCAA Division II
 2007: Men's lacrosse – NCAA Division II
 2008: Hudson Harrison (165 lbs), wrestling – NCAA Division II
 2009: Women's ice hockey – NCAA Division I
 2009: Women's rowing – NCAA Division II
 2010: Josh Shields (165 lbs), wrestling – NCAA Division II
 2011: Women's rowing – NCAA Division II
 2013: Men's lacrosse – NCAA Division II
 2016: Willie Bohince (125 lbs), wrestling – NCAA Division II
 2017: Willie Bohince (125 lbs), wrestling – NCAA Division II

Non-varsity sports
American Collegiate Hockey Association (ACHA) – Divisions I and III
 Men's ice hockey (College Hockey Mid-America)

Alumni
 Meghan Agosta, Olympic ice-hockey player
 Dan Altavilla, professional baseball player
 Polly Bukta, member of the Iowa House of Representatives 
 Joan Chittister, author and member of the Benedictine Sisters of Erie, Pennsylvania, serving as prioress for 12 years
 John Reilly Costello, professional baseball player
 John Deasy, Irish Fine Gael politician
 James "Buster" Douglas, 1981–1999, professional heavyweight boxer
 Pat Harkins, member of the Pennsylvania House of Representatives (2007–present).
 Matthew Hatchette, professional football player
 Rob Keefe, professional football coach
 David Emmer Lee, professional baseball player
 David Lough, professional baseball player
 Anthony Maher, professional soccer player
 Mike McLellan, professional lacrosse player
 Patrick Merrill, professional lacrosse player
 Terry Smith, professional basketball player.
 Brandon Staley, professional football coach

References

External links 

 
 Mercyhurst Athletics website

 
Educational institutions established in 1926
Education in Erie, Pennsylvania
Universities and colleges in Erie County, Pennsylvania
Tourist attractions in Erie, Pennsylvania
Sisters of Mercy colleges and universities
Catholic universities and colleges in Pennsylvania
1926 establishments in Pennsylvania
Former women's universities and colleges in the United States
Association of Catholic Colleges and Universities